Grant Supaphongs (born 12 April 1976) is a Thai racing driver currently competing in the TCR International Series and TCR Thailand Touring Car Championship. Having previously competed in the Thailand Super Series.

Racing career
Supaphongs began his career in 2008 in the Thailand Super Series, he raced in the Super 2000 class for three seasons up until 2010. Winning the championship every season for that period. After a four-year hiatus, he returned to racing in 2014 where he switched to GTC class in the Thailand Super Series, he finished second in the standings that year. Before winning the championship in 2015. He switched to the all new 2016 TCR Thailand Touring Car Championship the following year.

In August 2016 it was announced that he would race in the TCR International Series, driving a SEAT León Cup Racer for Kratingdaeng Racing Team.

Racing record

Complete TCR International Series results
(key) (Races in bold indicate pole position) (Races in italics indicate fastest lap)

References

External links
 
 
 

1976 births
Living people
TCR International Series drivers
Grant Supaphongs
Toyota Gazoo Racing drivers
Nürburgring 24 Hours drivers